Peter Koning (born 3 December 1990) is a Dutch professional racing cyclist, who most recently rode for UCI Continental team . He was named in the startlist for the 2017 Vuelta a España.

Major results

2007
 1st  Time trial, National Junior Road Championships
2012
 1st  Time trial, National Under-23 Road Championships
 5th Ronde van Midden-Nederland
 7th Overall Olympia's Tour
2013
 2nd Overall Olympia's Tour
 5th Rabo Baronie Breda Classic
2014
 1st Stage 1 (TTT) Czech Cycling Tour
 4th Overall Okolo Slovenska
1st Stage 1 (TTT)
 5th Duo Normand (with Brian van Goethem)
2016
 1st Grote Prijs Beeckman-De Caluwé
 1st Stage 3 Tour de San Luis
 4th Overall Tour of Iran (Azerbaijan)
1st Stage 2
2018
 1st  Mountains classification Tour of Croatia
2019
 1st  Overall Tour of Mersin
1st Stage 3
 7th Overall Tour of Mesopotamia
 7th PWZ Zuidenveld Tour

Grand Tour general classification results timeline

References

External links

1990 births
Living people
Dutch male cyclists
People from Venhuizen
Cyclists from North Holland